Jeff Richardson may refer to:
Jeff Richardson (infielder) (born 1965), Major League Baseball infielder
Jeff Richardson (pitcher) (born 1963), baseball pitcher
Jeff Richardson (cricketer), former Bermudian cricketer
Jeff Richardson (American football) (born 1944), American football player

See also
Geoff Richardson (disambiguation)